Specific thrust is the thrust per unit air mass flowrate of a jet engine (e.g. turbojet, turbofan, etc.) and can be calculated by the ratio of net thrust/total intake airflow.

Low specific thrust engines tend to be more efficient of propellant (at subsonic speeds), but also have a lower effective exhaust velocity and lower maximum airspeed. Engines considered to have high specific thrust are mostly used for supersonic speeds, and extremely high specific thrust engines can achieve hypersonic speeds.

Low specific thrust engines

A modern civil turbofan has a low specific thrust (~30 lbf/(lb/s)) to keep the jet noise at an acceptable level, and to achieve low fuel consumption, because a low specific thrust helps to improve specific fuel consumption (SFC). This low specific thrust is usually achieved with a high bypass ratio. Additionally a low specific thrust implies that the engine is relatively large in diameter, for the net thrust it generates. Consequently, such aircraft engines are normally located externally, in a separate nacelle or pod, attached to the wing, or the rear fuselage.

High specific thrust engines

By contrast, military turbofans often feature fairly high specific thrust (45-110 lbf/(lb/s)), which keeps the cross-sectional area of the engine low to more easily accommodate a narrow fuselage, which minimizes drag. A high specific thrust usually results in higher noise levels, which is not an important consideration for most military applications.

Maximum airspeed

Specific thrust has significant bearing on thrust lapse rate: the low jet velocity associated with a low specific thrust engine implies that there are large reductions in net thrust with increasing flight velocity, which can only be partially offset by throttle changes at rated conditions (e.g. maximum recommended climb rating).

Supersonic aircraft

Supersonic aircraft require a high specific thrust, since that gives a high exhaust speed.

Afterburners

Dry specific thrust has impact upon the performance of afterburning turbofans.

A low (dry) specific thrust engine has a low tailpipe temperature, which means that the temperature rise across the afterburner can be high, giving a good thrust boost in afterburning. Nevertheless, the afterburning specific thrust is still relatively low. The total fuel flow (main combustor plus afterburner) is fixed by the temperature rise from air intake to nozzle and, for a given airflow, changes little with dry specific thrust. Consequently, the low afterburning thrust implies a high afterburning SFC. However, the dry SFC is low.

The situation is completely reversed for a high (dry) specific thrust.

Consequently, engine designers must select a level of dry specific thrust that is suitable for the engine application. A compromise may be required.

References

See also
Specific impulse/exhaust velocity
Thrust-to-weight ratio
Jet engine

Jet engines